Aphanius sureyanus, the Burdur toothcarp or Sureyan killifish, is a species of freshwater fish in the family Cyprinodontidae.

The species is endemic to Lake Burdur in Turkey. It feeds mainly on an endemic copepod Arctodiaptomus burduricus. The toothcarp is threatened by the water loss of Lake Burdur due to the feeds into the lake being dammed, excessive water being taken from the lake, and a reduction in rainfall due to climate change. An increase in salinity levels further impacts the species.

References

Endemic fauna of Turkey
sureyanus
Endangered fish
Fish described in 1937
Taxonomy articles created by Polbot
Taxobox binomials not recognized by IUCN